Page One: Inside the New York Times is an American documentary film by Andrew Rossi, which premiered at the 2011 Sundance Film Festival. Magnolia Pictures and Participant Media jointly acquired the U.S. distribution rights and released the film theatrically in Summer 2011.  The film grossed over one million dollars at the US box office and has been nominated for two News & Documentary Emmy Awards as well as a Critics' Choice Award for Best Documentary Feature.

Synopsis
From the Sundance Program Description:

With the Internet surpassing print as our main news source, and newspapers going bankrupt, ... Page One chronicles the media industry's transformation and assesses the high stakes for democracy ... The film deftly makes a beeline for the eye of the storm or, depending on how you look at it, the inner sanctum of the media, gaining unprecedented access to The New York Times newsroom for a year. At the media desk, a dialectical play-within-a-play transpires as writers like salty David Carr track print journalism's metamorphosis even as their own paper struggles to stay vital and solvent, publishing material from WikiLeaks and encouraging writers to connect more directly with their audience. Meanwhile, rigorous journalism—including vibrant cross-cubicle debate and collaboration, tenacious jockeying for on-record quotes, and skillful page-one pitching—is alive and well. The resources, intellectual capital, stamina, and self-awareness mobilized when it counts attest there are no shortcuts when analyzing and reporting complex truths.

Stories and issues
 Publication of Afghan war logs by WikiLeaks
 Release of the iPad
 Bankruptcy of the Tribune Company
 NBC Universal merger with Comcast
 The Jayson Blair scandal
 Judith Miller
 Gawker and its "Big Board"
 ProPublica and new models for investigative reporting
 Charging for news online
 Watergate and the Pentagon Papers
 Staff cuts in Network News and coverage of the White House
 The purported end of U.S. combat operations in Iraq
 CNN's partnership with Vice

Cast

 New York Times Media Desk
 David Carr: Media columnist
 Bruce Headlam: Media editor
 Richard Pérez-Peña: Media reporter
 Tim Arango: Former media reporter, Baghdad bureau chief
 Brian Stelter: Media reporter

 New York Times Business Desk
 Andrew Ross Sorkin: Financial columnist
 Larry Ingrassia: Business editor

 New York Times Foreign Desk
 Susan Chira: Foreign editor
 Ian Fisher: Deputy foreign editor
 Joseph Kahn: Deputy foreign editor

 New York Times Masthead
 Bill Keller: Executive editor
 Jill Abramson: Managing editor
 Dean Baquet: Assistant managing editor/Washington bureau chief

 Featured interviews
 Sarah Ellison
 Clay Shirky
 Carl Bernstein
 David Remnick
 Nick Denton
 Jeff Jarvis
 Gay Talese
 Alex Jones
 Katrina vanden Heuvel
 Jimmy Wales
 Nicholas Lemann
 Seth Mnookin
 Michael Hirschorn
 James McQuivey
 Others featured
 Julian Assange (In phone interview with Brian Stelter)
 Brian Lam
 Markos Moulitsas
 Noam Cohen: Special columnist

Critical reception
The film was nominated for a 2011 Critics' Choice Award for Best Documentary and has also been nominated for two News & Documentary Emmy Awards.

The film received positive reviews from critics, with an approval rating of 80% at Rotten Tomatoes and an average score of 68 at Metacritic. It also received an A from indieWire.  Katey Rich of Cinema Blend writes, "Even 30 years from now ... Page One will remain a vital and fascinating portrait of the news and the people who make it."  Entertainment Weekly described the film as an "unexpected gotta-see doc," while Vanity Fair called it "slick, fun, and surprisingly sexy."  Somewhat less positively, Justin Chang of Variety says of the film, "Rossi's coverage of daily news meetings and interviews with editorial staffers aren't as juicy as one might have hoped or expected, but for journos (who will likely rep the film's most appreciative audience), simply being a fly on these hallowed walls will offer much to savor," but Eric Kohn of Indiewire counters, "Rossi captures the minutiae of the newsroom, from the rapid transcription of interviews to the rush of deadlines, as if observing an Olympic sport."  Regarding David Carr, Tim Wu of Slate describes him as "a sympathetic hero for what turns out to be a riveting film," and David Fear of Time Out Chicago adds, "it's his H.L. Mencken–like attitude toward old-school reporting that offers the best example for why traditional news-gathering won't ever truly die."  Sebastian Doggart of the UK's Telegraph describes Carr as the "Keith Richards of the Fourth Estate", and adds that the film is "enthralling" and "inspiring."

A notable departure from the positive reception was Michael Kinsley's review in The Times itself.  He noted:  "Having seen Page One, I don't know much more than I did before. The movie, directed by Andrew Rossi, is, in a word, a mess."

Awards
 Denver Film Critics Society – Best Documentary
Phoenix Film Critics Society – Best Documentary
Oklahoma Film Critics Circle – Best Documentary
San Diego Film Critics Society – Best Documentary nomination
Dallas-Fort Worth Film Critics Association – Best Documentary nomination
Broadcast Film Critics Association – Best Documentary nomination
News & Documentary Emmy Awards – Outstanding Informational Programming – Long Form nomination, Outstanding Individual Achievement in a Craft: Editing – Documentary and Long Form nomination

References

External links
 
 
 Page One: Inside the New York Times at Sundance Film Festival
 C-SPAN Q&A interview with Rossi about Page One, June 19, 2011

2011 films
American documentary films
Documentary films about newspaper publishing
Films about The New York Times
Films about freedom of expression
Participant (company) films
Films shot in New York City
Films directed by Andrew Rossi
Films about journalism
Documentary films about journalism
Films about journalists
2010s English-language films
2010s American films